The Malaysia Under-19 cricket team represents the country of Malaysia in U-19 international cricket.

They qualified for the 2008 Under-19 Cricket World Cup, which they also hosted, and as of date is their only qualification in the Under-19 Cricket World Cup, which is also considered as their biggest success to date and is also considered as the biggest success in Malaysian cricketing history.

Malaysia took part in the 2009 ACC Under-19 Elite Cup, finishing in 5th position. They lost only two matches in the group stages to Hong Kong and Nepal.

ICC Under-19 World Cup record

Team Officials

Manager - M.F.T Senathiraj - 2015 to present

Head coach - Thushara Kodikara - 2015
Head coach - Suresh Navaratnam - 2016
Head coach - Emdadol Haq - 2017
Head coach - Suresh Navaratnam - 2017

References

Under-19 cricket teams
Malaysia in international cricket